Fiona Benson may refer to:
 Fiona Benson (athlete)
 Fiona Benson (poet)